Munkacs Football Academy Mukachevo is a Ukrainian football team from Mukachevo, Zakarpattia Oblast. The club was formed in 2005 as the children and youth football club "Mukachevo". The club represents the Hungarian diaspora in Ukraine and is supported by Kisvárda FC from the neighboring city of Kisvárda, Mukachevo's twin town.

The club started out as a football academy fielding its teams in various youth competitions including "Leather ball" competitions, regional, national, and international competitions. Since 2014 the club started to field its senior team in regional football competitions of Zakarpattia Oblast.

Honors

Ukraine
Zakarpattia Oblast championship
 Winners (3): 2007, 2008, 2012

Current squad

League and cup history

Managers

  Viktor Ryashko (2018 — 19 July 2020)
  Viktor Yaichnyk (20 July 2020 — 25 May 2021)
  Vitaliy Shumskyi (25 May 2021 — present)

See also
 FC Karpaty Mukacheve
 FC Zakarpattia Uzhhorod
 FC Fetrovyk Khust

References

External links
Official website.
Team's page. Football Federation of Zakarpattia (Transcarpathia).

Ukrainian Second League clubs
2005 establishments in Ukraine
Sport in Mukachevo
Football clubs in Zakarpattia Oblast
Association football clubs established in 2005
Amateur football clubs in Ukraine